Lonquimay River is a river of the Araucanía Region of Chile. It originates from glaciers of the Sierra Nevada volcano, runs generally northeast past the town of Lonquimay, and is a tributary of the Biobío River.

Rivers of Chile
Rivers of Araucanía Region